Sebastes diaconus, the deacon rockfish, is a species of marine ray-finned fish belonging to the subfamily Sebastinae, the rockfishes, part of the family Scorpaenidae. It is found in the eastern Pacific Ocean.

Discovery

Between 2002 and 2004, phylogeographic research on blue rockfish (Sebastes mystinus) identified a distinct genetic subpopulation, which was sampled between Cape Mendocino in northern California and Neah Bay, Washington. Subsequent research identified further genetic evidence supporting this distinct subpopulation, as well as demographic differences and evidence for reproductive isolation. The subpopulation was cited as an example of incipient speciation. In 2015, distinct morphological traits were identified for the northern subpopulation and it was recognized as a distinct species, classified as Sebastes diaconus.

Etymology
The specific epithet diaconus (deacon) refers to an 'acolyte', which is a reference to the specific epithet of the blue rockfish, mystinus, which means 'priest' in Latin. Like the two species, an acolyte and priest are similar in appearance.

Description
The deacon rockfish has been described as a cryptic species that is difficult to distinguish from the blue rockfish. The deacon rockfish however has more visible stripes in its coloration, whereas the blue rockfish has a 'blotchy' color pattern. As such, prior to the formal classification of the species, the deacon rockfish was referred to as the 'blue-sided rockfish' and the blue rockfish was referred to as the 'blue-blotched rockfish'. The shape of the mouth and front of the face also differs subtly between the two species, with the deacon rockfish exhibiting a longer lower jaw, which results in an underbite. Under dissection, sexually mature female deacon rockfish also have a small pink or cream colored ovary, whereas mature female blue rockfish have a large orange ovary.

The shape of sagittal otoliths has been found to subtly differ between males and females, which may indicate secondary sexual dimorphism.

Genetics
Genetic differences have been identified between male and female deacon rockfish using RAD sequencing. Such differences may reflect the evolution of sex chromosomes in the species or psueuoautosomal regions within the genome (see wider discussion of sex chromosome evolution), or intralocus sexual conflict, although the function and evolutionary significance of these genetic sites is currently uncertain. A potential PCR-RFLP genetic sex marker developed for gopher rockfish does not successfully distinguish male and female deacon rockfish.

Distribution and habitat
The deacon rockfish is found on rocky reefs and offshore areas from northern California to southern British Columbia. The species is sympatric with the blue rockfish in northern California and Oregon. Female deacon rockfish can exhibit a high level of residency, showing site fidelity to a particular reef and inhabiting a small home range. However, females may relocate depending upon daily and seasonal movement patterns, seasonally occurring hypoxia, and prey preferences for planktonic organisms.

Ecology
Deacon rockfish may be adapted to diurnal hunting on small, transparent plankton.  Individuals have been found to ingest gelatinous zooplankton such as the colonial tunicates Pyrosoma atlanticum, the hydrozoan Velella velella, and the ctenophore Pleurobrachia bachei, as well as small planktonic crustaceans such as crab zoeae and megalopae and pelagic amphipods.

Fishing and management
Deacon rockfish are caught both commercially and recreationally in Oregon. In 2017, the stock assessment for Oregon and California combined deacon rockfish and blue rockfish for management purposes. The stock assessment estimated the combined populations in California to have declined rapidly in the 1970s and 1980s to a low point in 1995 and then increased to a point close to the management target. The stocks in Oregon were estimated as having never experienced the same intensity of fishing as in California with spawning biomass remaining above the management target throughout the history of fishing.

In Oregon, nearshore and offshore populations of deacon rockfish are de facto managed as separate stocks in order to comply with wider regulations on Sebastes rockfish fishing, although population genetic evidence does not support this distinction.

References

External links
 Deacon Rockfish, Oregon Department of Fish and Wildlife
 Deacon Rockfish, Washington Department of Fish and Wildlife
 Meet the Deacon Rockfish, Oregon Marine Reserves

diaconus
Taxa named by Benjamin W. Frable
Taxa named by David Wolfe Wagman
Taxa named by Taylor N. Frierson
Taxa named by Andres Aguilar
Taxa named by Brian L. Sidlauskas
Fish described in 2015
Fish of the Pacific Ocean